Homolium or Homolion or Homole (Ὁμόλη) was a town and polis (city-state) of Magnesia in ancient Thessaly, situated at the foot of Mount Homole, and near the edge of the vale of Tempe. Mt. Homole was the part of the chain of Ossa lying between Tempe and the modern village of Karitsa. Mt. Homole is sometimes used as synonymous with Ossa. It was celebrated as a favourite haunt of Pan, and as the abode of the Centaurs and the Lapithae. Pausanias describes it as the most fertile mountain in Thessaly, and well supplied with fountains. 

Ancient authors differed in their descriptions of the town's location. Both Pseudo-Scylax and Strabo seem to place it on the right bank of the Peneius near the exit of the vale of Tempe, and consequently at some distance from the sea; but in Apollonius Rhodius and in the Orphic poems Homolium is described as situated near the sea-shore, and in Apollonius even another town, Eurymenae, is placed between Homolium and Tempe. Eurymenae, however, stood upon the coast more to the south.

Homolium minted coins dated to the 4th century BCE.

Homolium's site is at the modern village of Laspochori, in the municipal unit of Evrymenes.

References

External links
 Archaeological Atlas of the Aegean
 The Geography of Strabo
 Herakles Numismatics
 Ancient Thessaly
 NumisWiki
 Strabo: Geography
 Ancient Greek Coins
 Strabon: Geografia

Cities in ancient Greece
Populated places in ancient Thessaly
Ancient Magnesia
Former populated places in Greece
Thessalian city-states